The Strange Affair is a 1968 British crime drama film directed by David Greene and starring Michael York, Jeremy Kemp and Susan George.

Plot
Peter Strange (Michael York) is an idealistic young police recruit who gets mixed up with the machinations of the tough and jaded Scotland Yard Detective Sergeant Pierce (Jeremy Kemp). Pierce is trying to arrest a gang for drug smuggling and later murder, but is thwarted respectively by a corrupt colleague and an unconvincing witness. Strange is shocked by finding the dead body of a murdered informant he knew and is himself brutally assaulted. Meanwhile, Strange is having an affair with Frederika (Susan George), a minor who he does not know is part of a pornography ring; her supposed aunt and uncle film and photograph her sexual encounters from behind a one-way mirror. (Susan George was 17 at the time the film was shot.)

Pierce obtains copies of photographs of Strange's sexual encounter with Frederika and threatens to expose him to his superiors, ending his career, unless Strange plants some heroin on one of the gang. Strange reluctantly agrees, despite planning to leave the force anyway, as he is disillusioned by the failure to catch and convict the drugs gang. Pierce's planting of evidence is revealed and he is convicted of perverting the course of justice and jailed.

Cast
 Michael York as Peter Strange
 Jeremy Kemp as Pierce
 Susan George as Frederika 'Fred' March
 Jack Watson as Quince
 George A. Cooper as Kingsley
 Barry Fantoni as Charley Small
 Jeremy Wilkin as PC Wills
 Rita Webb as Charley's Mum
 Madge Ryan as Aunt Mary
 George Benson as Uncle Bertrand
 Nigel Davenport as Defence Attorney
 Artro Morris as Inspector Evans
 Patrick Connor as Sergeant Mac

Production

Filming
It was shot at Twickenham Studios and on location around London. The film's sets were designed by the art director Brian Eatwell.

Critical reception
 Allmovie wrote: "a fragmentary "'60s" interpretation of a straightforward Bernard Toms novel...Like many British films of its period, it seems more concerned with inducing pop-art headaches than simply telling its story.
 Time Out wrote: "a well-written anecdote about police manners and methods, straight out of some TV cop series, but as viewed by Greene's wilfully wayward camera, it becomes a bizarre, quirkishly funny thriller which laces its documentary surface with a fine grain of fantasy. Much of Greene's later work disappointed, but here he displays a visual flair (gang violence in an echoing warehouse, murder among the wrecked cars in a scrapheap, seduction in a fantastically opulent boudoir) that would not entirely have shamed Welles in his Lady from Shanghai mood.
 The New York Times wrote: "If the muscular and sexy goings-on are excessive and irrational on occasion, some of the principals lend credible, physical support to their characterizations. Michael York...is properly personable and confused as the harried Strange. Susan George, a comparative newcomer who is pert, snub-nosed and pretty, makes eroticism a pleasure, even if her sudden switch from promiscuity to Strange's everloving girl, remains a mystery. Jeremy Kemp is convincingly neurotic as the indomitable sergeant...They all prove that "The Strange Affair" is where the sensational action is, even if it is entirely strange and unbelievable.

References

External links
 
 
 

1968 films
1968 crime films
British crime films
1960s English-language films
Films directed by David Greene
Films scored by Basil Kirchin
Films based on British novels
Police detective films
Paramount Pictures films
Films set in London
Films shot in London
Films shot at Twickenham Film Studios
Films with screenplays by Stanley Mann
Films produced by Stanley Mann
1960s British films